The Network Hub is a 9,800 square-foot coworking space in East Vancouver, British Columbia. The space functions as a start-up launchpad for entrepreneurs and small businesses. Members of the shared workspace have access to shared and private offices, meeting rooms, courier services, office utilities, and monthly events focused on business and technology.

Launched in the summer of 2006, it is the longest running coworking space in Vancouver. Members can rent space by the day, week, month or year. Additional services include a receptionist and phone answering services.

In 2010, CBC's Rick Chung featured The Network Hub as part of a growing trend toward coworking spaces. The Network Hub emphasizes community partnerships and networking activities.

The Network Hub has been nominated for a 2012 Small Business Influencer Award: Corporations. The company has been featured in Mashable, CNN, CBC, and Get Connected magazine.

History

The Network Hub was launched in 2006. The original office is in downtown Vancouver, Canada. In 2011, the company launched an additional site in New Westminster, Canada.

The company's founding members have experience as web designers and programmers with a background in entrepreneurship. The stated goal of the organization is to “To help people with great ideas launch their business faster and leaner”.

The Network Hub hosts businesses from different industries. Clients include software developers, gaming companies, designers, consultants, and marketing service providers. The Network Hub hosted eight small businesses in 2006, all headed by entrepreneurs under the age of 30. By 2007 the company hosted 20 small businesses, primarily in Information Technology. In 2009, The Network Hub hosted 35 businesses. The average time of use for long-term clients is two years.

Get Connected magazine featured the Network Hub as an example of cost-saving business models in their Spring 2009 edition.

In 2010, CBC's Rick Chung featured The Network Hub as part of a growing trend toward coworking spaces.

In 2011, The Network Hub announced plans to use the office space as an art gallery showcasing local Vancouver artists.  Artists partnering with The Network Hub received one hundred percent of all sales. Featured artists include Scott Sueme, Jonathan Taggart, and Jason Athens.

Sarah Kessler featured The Network Hub as a model coworking space in several articles for Mashable Business’ website in January 2011.

Membership

Members access space ranging from individual desks to large office spaces and meeting rooms.

Events

The Network Hub hosts monthly Meet-Up events for entrepreneurs in the Vancouver area. It organizes the largest monthly networking event in Vancouver, the Vancouver Entrepreneur Meetup, which has featured speakers such as Vancouver's Mayor Gregor Robertson. In addition to the Vancouver Entrepreneur event, The Network Hub also hosts other Meet-Up events that cover WordPress, web design, Drupal, Joomla, blogging, social media, and being a mom CEO. The Network Hub also hosted a WordPress Theme Hackathon.

Freelance camp Vancouver conference
In 2010, The Network Hub sponsored the first annual Freelance Camp Vancouver Conference. This program is designed for freelancers and provides skill training and networking opportunities. Previous trainings have included web design, invoicing, and social media networking strategies. The 2012 conference is scheduled for September.

NASA space apps challenge hack-a-thon
The Network Hub hosted 2012's NASA Space Apps Challenge Hack-A-Thon. The 48-hour event challenged members of the hacker community to develop new software to solve space-themed tasks for NASA.

Royal Columbian hospital fundraiser
In 2012, The Network Hub expanded community partnership activities. In June, the New Westminster branch sponsored the Royal Columbian Hospital Fundraiser in British Columbia.

Awards

The Network Hub is currently in consideration for a 2012 Small Business Influencer Award: Corporations.

External links
The Network Hub website

References

Companies established in 2006